Delhi School of Social Work is a school of social work in India and the first graduate school of social work in Asia to be recognized by a university. It is formally known as the Department of Social Work (DSW) of University of Delhi.

History 
DSSW was established in August 1946 as The National Y.W.C.A. School of Social Work at Lucknow, Uttar Pradesh and became the second school of social work in India after Tata Institute of Social Sciences. It was set up by the Y.W.C.A. of India, Burma and Ceylon (which is now known as National Y.W.C.A. of India) with substantial assistance from the Foreign Division of the Y.W.C.A. of the United States. It started a one-year programme to give training in social work to the women who were demobilised by the armed services, known as the Women's Auxiliary Corps of India. Ms. Nora Ventura, who was then the Secretary of Religious Education Committee of the Y.W.C.A., took the directorship of the school, which had two students – one from Sindh and the other from Bengal. Towards the end of 1946, Elmina R. Lucke  of Y.W.C.A. took over as the consultant organiser of the school.

In 1948, the school was shifted to Delhi with the support of Sir Maurice Gwyer, then vice-chancellor of University of Delhi,   and started offering social work courses of varying duration. It functioned from the old Air Force Barracks located on the corner of the Mall Road and 3 – University Road. By March 1949, the school became an "autonomous post-graduate institution of the Faculty of Social Service of the University of Delhi" and the name was changed to Delhi School of Social Work. Dorothy Moses was appointed as the first principal of the school. DSSW was managed by Delhi School of Social Work Society with representatives of the Y.W.C.A, the Ministries of Education and Health and the University of Delhi in its board. In 1953, Miss Moses left the school to take up an assignment on behalf of the UNESCO in Ceylon. M. S. Gore  succeeded Miss Moses as principal, and served the institution until 1962. During the tenure of Prof. S. N. Ranade, DSSW witnessed its larger integration with University of Delhi. In April 1961 D.S.S.W was taken over by University of Delhi, with its PhD program and M.Phil. program beginning in 1965 and 1976 respectively. In 1979 Delhi School of Social Work (DSSW) became the Department of Social Work, University of Delhi.

In 2008 the Department of Social work initiated a flood relief and rehabilitation project called UDAI (University for Development Action and Integrated learning) for 2008 Bihar flood victims under the aegis of University of Delhi In the same year, National AIDS Control Organisation (NACO) set up its State Training and Resource Centre (STRC) at DSSW for the capacity building of partner organizations implementing Targeted Intervention projects for High Risk Groups (HRG) of HIV with Delhi State AIDS Control Society.

DSSW was ranked as the second-best school of social work in India for the years 2011 and 2012 successively by the Outlook.

Programs 
 M.A. in Social Work (Generic course)
 M.Phil. in Social Work
 Ph.D. in Social Work

Faculty 

Prof. Manoj Jha
 Prof. Sanjai Bhatt
 Prof. Sushma Batra
 Prof. Neera Agnimitra
 Prof. Pamela Singla
 Dr. Seema Sharma

Research projects and centers  
 Centre for Community Development and Action (CCDA)
 Gender Resource Centre – Suvidha Kendra
 Centre for Child and Adolescent Well Being
 Training, Orientation and Research Centre (TORC)
 State Training and Resource Centre (STRC)
 University for Development Action and Integrated Learning (UDAI)-II

Placements
Bachpan Bachao Andolan
Indo Global Social Service Society
National Association for the Blind
Tihar Jail
The Hans Foundation
KPMG
Tata Power
GAIL
Vedanta Resources
Ashok Leyland

Notable alumni
 Nandita Das, an award-winning Indian film actress and director
 Anjana Om Kashyap, Indian journalist
 Panduranga Hegde, environmentalist, Chipko Movement leader
 Usha Narayanan, First Lady of India (1997 to 2002)
 Malvika Iyer, motivational speaker and disability rights activist
 Manoj Jha, politician and member of Upper House of Indian Parliament (Rajya Sabha).
 Kapil Mishra, politician and former MLA, represented Karawal Nagar (Delhi Assembly constituency) in the Sixth Legislative Assembly of Delhi

References

External links 
 Department of Social Work, University of Delhi 

Education in Delhi